The Battle of Aliwal was fought on 28 January 1846 between the British and Sikh forces in northern India (now Punjab, India). The British were led by Sir Harry Smith, while the Sikhs were led by Ranjodh Singh Majithia. Britain's victory in the battle is sometimes regarded as the turning point in the First Anglo-Sikh War.

Background
The First Anglo-Sikh War began six years after the death of Ranjit Singh, who had established the Sikh Empire in the Punjab. The Punjab became increasingly disordered, while the British increased their military forces on their border with the Punjab. Eventually, the increasingly turbulent Sikh Khalsa Army was goaded into crossing the Sutlej River and invading British territory, under leaders who were distrustful of their own troops.

On 21 December and 22 December 1845, the army of the British East India Company commanded by Sir Hugh Gough and the Governor-General of Bengal, Sir Henry Hardinge, fought the bloody Battle of Ferozeshah. The Sikh armies under Vizier Lal Singh and Commander in Chief Tej Singh eventually retreated, but the British army was shaken by its heavy losses. They did not renew hostilities for some weeks, and Hardinge sought to relieve Gough of his command, blaming his tactics for the heavy casualties.

The Sikhs too were temporarily disheartened by the retreats ordered by their commanders. However, they were reinforced by troops who had not yet seen action and moved back across the Sutlej to occupy a bridgehead at Sobraon, while a detachment under Ranjodh Singh Majithia (sometimes transcribed as Runjoor Singh), with 7,000 men and 20 guns, crossed higher up the Sutlej to besiege the British-held fortress of Ludhiana and menace Gough's and Hardinge's supply lines. The British commanders detached a division under Sir Harry Smith to clear this threat to their rear.

Campaign
On 16 January 1846, Smith recovered two outposts which the Sikhs had seized at Fategarh and Dharmkot. Although Runjodh Singh's irregular cavalry had raided over a wide area and set fire to part of the British cantonments at Ludhiana, his main body was advancing only slowly on Ludhiana.

Harry Smith first intended to attack Runjodh Singh's army at Buddowal. However, on learning of the Sikh strength, and receiving further orders from Gough, he instead force-marched his troops via Jagraon, collecting a British regiment there, to reach Ludhiana ahead of the Sikh main body. On 21 January, as he left Buddowal, the Sikh irregular cavalry (the Gorchurras) continually attacked his rearguards. They captured most of Smith's baggage animals (mules, bullocks and elephants), and cut down any straggling troops. Nevertheless, Smith succeeded in reaching Ludhiana, with his troops exhausted. A brigade of troops from Delhi, including two Gurkha battalions, reinforced him.

After resting his troops, Smith once again advanced to Buddowal. The Sikhs had withdrawn to Aliwal on the Sutlej, awaiting reinforcements. On 28 January, Smith advanced against them, cautiously at first.

Battle

The Sutlej ran close to their rear for the entire length of their line, making it difficult for them to manoeuvre and also potentially disastrous if they were forced to retreat.

After the initial artillery salvoes, Smith determined that Aliwal was the Sikh weak point. He sent two of his four infantry brigades to capture the village, from where they could enfilade the Sikh centre. They seized the village, and began pressing forwards to threaten the fords across the Sutlej.

As the Sikhs tried to swing back their left, pivoting on Bhundri, some of their cavalry presented a threat to the open British left flank. A British and Indian cavalry brigade, led by the 16th Lancers, charged and dispersed them. The 16th Lancers then attacked a large body of Sikh infantry. These were battalions organised and trained in contemporary European fashion by Neapolitan mercenary, Paolo Di Avitabile. They formed square to establish a strong front against a cavalry charge, as most European armies did. Nevertheless, the 16th Lancers broke the square. Both forces suffered heavy casualties.

The infantry in the Sikh centre tried to defend a nullah (dry stream bed), but were enfiladed and forced into the open by a Bengal infantry regiment and then cut down by fire from Smith's batteries of Bengal Horse Artillery.

Unlike most of the battles of both Anglo-Sikh Wars, when the Sikhs at Aliwal began to retreat, the retreat quickly turned into a disorderly rout. When the Sikh soldiers fled across the fords, they abandoned most of their guns, either on the river bank or in the fords, along with all baggage, tents and supplies. They lost 2,000 men and 67 guns.

Aftermath
Smith wrote afterwards:

Many commentators referred to Smith's victory as the "Battle without a mistake". Except for the 16th Lancers, who lost 144 men out of about 300, few of Smith's units had heavy casualties.

Order of battle

British regiments
16th The Queen's Lancers
31st Foot
50th Foot
53rd Foot

Indian regiments
Governor General’s Bodyguard
1st Bengal Native Cavalry
3rd Bengal Native Cavalry
5th Bengal Native Cavalry
4th Irregular Cavalry
Shekawati Cavalry
3 Batteries of Horse Artillery
2 Field Batteries of Artillery
24th Bengal Native Infantry
36th Bengal Native Infantry
47th Bengal Native Infantry
48th Bengal Native Infantry
Nasiri Gurkha Battalion
Sirmoor Gurkha Battalion

Notes

References

External links
BritishBattles.com
SikhPhilosophy.Net – History of Sikhism

History of Sikhism
Battles of the Anglo-Sikh wars
Battles involving the British East India Company
History of Punjab, India
Conflicts in 1846
1846 in India
January 1846 events